Fly Angola (FLA), stylized FLУ AO Angola, is a privately owned airline based in the country of Angola, specifically at Quatro de Fevereiro Airport in the nation's capital, Luanda. It is established in September 2018 by a "Portuguese agency" and "backed up" by Angolan investment firm Gestomobil. The airline flies to Angola's provincial capitals from its hub.

Fleet

As of June 2020, the airline only owns one Embraer EMB-145 LR registered D2-FDF filled with 50 standard economy class in a 1-2 configuration, with a second one planned to be ordered once the airline has secured its own Air Operator's Certificate. It is said that the motive behind the single-aircraft order is as a "trial." The airline was planning in late 2019 to buy a 30-seat Embraer EMB-120. The airline's services are performed by a local partner, Angolan airline AeroJet, which owns Fly Angola's AOC.

Destinations
Fly Angola operates domestic flights from Luanda to four major cities.

COVID-19 pandemic 
Fly Angola issued a statement on its Facebook account that it will "significantly reduce its activity in the coming days," and "will make adjustments as necessary," in accordance to the Angolan government's measures regarding the COVID-19 pandemic and aviation.

Notes

References

External links 
 

Airlines established in 2018
Airlines of Angola
Angolan brands
Airlines of Africa